"Can't Chance a Break Up" is a song written by Ike Turner. It was released by R&B duo Ike & Tina Turner on Sue Records in 1965.

Background and release 

"Can't Chance a Break Up" is the second single Ike & Tina Turner released after re-signing to Sue in 1965. They had released a string of hit singles on Sue from 1960 to 1962 before switching to Ike Turner's Sonja label in 1963. After releasing singles on various labels between 1963 and 1965, they returned to Sue with the release of "Two Is a Couple" was in October 1965. "Can't Chance a Break Up" was released as a non-album track in December 1965, reaching No. 33 on the Cash Box R&B chart in January 1966.

Critical reception 
Billboard (December 18, 1965): "This blues-rocker with wailing vocal performances loaded with electricity will prove a sales monster. Discotheque winner!"

Cash Box (December 18, 1965): "Wailing moanin’ powerfully orked soulfilled shouter. Easy to dance to sound and good romance lyric should have lots of appeal for the teen market generally and the r&b set in particular."

Record World (December 25, 1965): "Wailing new Ike and Tina side featuring go go rhythms for the dance fans. Score."

Track listing

Chart performance

References 

1965 singles
1965 songs
Ike & Tina Turner songs
Songs written by Ike Turner
Song recordings produced by Ike Turner
Sue Records singles